Johnson v Unisys Limited [2001] UKHL 13 is a leading UK labour law case on the measure of damages for unfair dismissal and the nature of the contract of employment.

Facts
After twenty years of working for Unisys Ltd in Milton Keynes, in 1994 Mr Johnson was dismissed for an alleged irregularity in his work. He suffered a mental breakdown, drank heavily, was admitted to mental hospital, could not find a new job despite over 100 applications and at age 52 was unlikely to have a promising future career. He claimed that he was wrongly dismissed, and that the manner of his dismissal, which was summarily without the chance of a fair hearing and with one month's pay in lieu only, caused his health problems. He sought compensation for unfair dismissal, and in addition for the manner of dismissal given the employer's breach of mutual trust and confidence.

Judgment
The House of Lords held that while Mr Johnson had been dismissed unfairly there could be no compensation for the manner of Mr Johnson's dismissal if that would exceed the statutory scheme laid out in the Employment Rights Act 1996 and the accompanying limits on compensation that could be sought through the system of employment tribunals. While a common law right to full compensation for breach of contract might exist, it could not circumvent the intention of Parliament in laying down limits to compensation for dismissals.

Lord Nicholls said the following.

Lord Steyn, dissenting, argued the statutory remedies in salary for wrongful dismissal inadequate, and the statutory term of notice did not prevent developing an implied term of good faith and fair dealing. There was no conflict between the requirement of notice and not to exercise the power in a harsh, humiliating manner.

Lord Hoffmann made some important remarks on the contract of employment.

See also

UK labour law

Notes

References
E McGaughey, A Casebook on Labour Law (Hart 2019) ch 3, 96

English contract case law
2001 in case law
2001 in British law
House of Lords cases
Unisys
United Kingdom labour case law
United Kingdom employment contract case law